"Baila el Chiki-chiki" ("Dance the Chiki-chiki") is a novelty song by Rodolfo Chikilicuatre, the  entry for the Eurovision Song Contest 2008, held in Belgrade, Serbia. The song was pre-qualified for the final round where it scored 55 points in total, placing 16th.

Background
The song is a parody of reggaeton music filled with jokes and references to the ¿Por qué no te callas? incident between Venezuelan president Hugo Chávez, the king of Spain Juan Carlos I and Spanish prime minister José Luis Rodríguez Zapatero. Reportedly the lyrics of the song changed due to the political allusions, as the EBU does not allow political remarks in any song in the competition.

The final version of the song featured allusions to some prominent Spanish figures, including Pau Gasol, Fernando Alonso, Javier Bardem, Antonio Banderas and Pedro Almodóvar. It also alluded to the 1995 Spanish hit single "La Macarena", Michael Jackson and RoboCop.

Eurovision

National final
In the national final of the Spanish selection Salvemos Eurovisión, the song beat the favourite, Coral, with her song "Todo está en tu mente", which ended second.

Eurovision final
As a member of the "Big Four", Spain automatically qualified for the Eurovision final, held on 24 May 2008.

Rodolfo Chikilicuatre was accompanied on stage by Disco and Gráfica, two comedic dancers that also accompanied him in the national final. Gráfica, played by fellow actress Silvia Abril, danced clumsily without knowing the basic dance steps. Another three dancers (Leticia Martín, María Ángeles Mas and Cecilia López) were chosen through the special casting show Dansin Chiki Chiki to join them in Belgrade.

Beyond Eurovision
"Baila el Chiki-Chiki" has also been performed by Chikilicuatre alongside popular figures such as King África, Tata Golosa, and Dustin the Turkey, among others.

Charts

Weekly charts

Year-end charts

References

External links 
 Official Eurovision Song Contest site, history by year, 2008.
 Detailed info and lyrics, The Diggiloo Thrush, "Baila el Chiki-chiki".
 Eurovision 2008 TVE's Official Web
 Rodolfo Chikilicuatre's Official Web
 Rodolfo Chikilicuatre's Former Official Web
 Final Video Clip (English Subtitles)

Eurovision songs of 2008
Eurovision songs of Spain
Spanish music
Reggaeton songs
Number-one singles in Greece
2008 in Spain
2008 songs